The Bachelor: London Calling is the twelfth season of ABC reality television series The Bachelor. The season premiere aired on March 17, 2008, and features Matt Grant, a 27-year-old British global financer, courting 25 women from the United States. The season concluded on May 12, 2008, with Grant choosing to propose to 22-year-old actress Shayne Lamas. The couple ended their relationship months later.

This was the final season to be aired in 90 minutes.

Matt Grant

He was an English financier and business development manager from London and worked at Lombard Asset Finance (RBS) in Cambridge for three years before moving to London. Grant received a B.A. in modern history and politics from Anglia Ruskin University in Cambridge.

Contestants

Biographical information according to ABC official series site, plus footnoted additions

Future Appearances

Bachelor Pad
Holly Durst returned in the second season of Bachelor Pad, and won that season alongside Bachelor Nation alumnus Michael Stagliano.

Call-out order

 The contestant received the first impression rose
 The contestant received a rose during the date
 The contestant was eliminated
 The contestant was eliminated during the date
 The contestant won the competition

Episodes

References

External links
The Bachelor official website

12
2008 American television seasons
Television shows filmed in California
Television shows filmed in Colorado
Television shows filmed in Florida
Television shows filmed in Barbados
Television shows shot in London